Daniel Inman is a Kelly Johnson Collegiate Professor and former Chair of the Department of Aerospace Engineering at the University of Michigan.

Education 
Inman received his Ph.D. from Michigan State University in Mechanical Engineering in 1980. He received his Master of Arts in Teaching Physics from Michigan State University in the Year 1975 and he Pursued Graduate Studies at Grand Valley State College in 1970.

Research and career 
Inman is currently working as “Kelly” Johnson Collegiate Professor at the University of Michigan in the Department of Aerospace Engineering. He is also an adjunct professor at the Virginia Polytechnic Institute and State University in the Department of Mechanical Engineering and also a Brunel Chair in Intelligent Materials and Structures at the University of Bristol, United Kingdom. He started his career as an instructor (1970–1976) at Grand Rapids Educational Park Physics Department. After that, he worked as a graduate research assistant (1976–1978) at Michigan State University. He was a member of technical staff (1978) at Bell Laboratories, Interconnection Group. Again, he worked as an instructor (1978–1979) - Michigan State University. He joined as a graduate research assistant (1979–1980) at Michigan State University. He worked as an assistant professor (1980–1984) at the State University of New York in the Department of Mechanical & Aerospace Engineering. He was an associate professor (1984–1987) at the State University of New York in the Department of Mechanical & Aerospace Engineering. He joined as a director for Mechanical Systems Laboratory (1984–1992) at the State University of New York in the Department of Mechanical & Aerospace Engineering. He worked as an adjunct professor (1986–1990) in the Division of Applied Mathematics and also visiting professor (1987–1988) in the Division of Applied Mathematics. He joined as a professor (1987–1992) at the State University of New York in the Department of Mechanical & Aerospace Engineering.

He worked as a professor and chairman (1989–1992) at the State University of New York in the department of Mechanical & Aerospace Engineering. He joined as an adjunct professor (1989–1992) at the University of Southern California Center for Applied Mathematical Sciences. He was the director for Mechanical Systems Laboratory (1992–1997) at Virginia Polytechnic Institute and State University in the Department of Engineering Science and Mechanics and also a Samuel Herrick Endowed Professor (1992–1998) at Virginia Polytechnic Institute and State University in the Department of Engineering Science and Mechanics. He worked as the director of center for Intelligent Material Systems and Structures (1997–2011) at Virginia Polytechnic Institute and State University in the Department of Mechanical Engineering and also a George R. Goodson Endowed Professor (1998–2011) at Virginia Polytechnic Institute and State University in the Department of Mechanical Engineering. He joined as an adjunct professor (2000–2011) at Virginia Polytechnic Institute and State University in the Department of Mathematics. Dr. Inman was an affiliate (2004–2011) at Virginia Polytechnic Institute and State University in the Department of Engineering Science and Mechanics. He worked as an affiliate (2005–2011) at Virginia Polytechnic Institute and State University in the Department of Aerospace and Ocean Engineering.

Awards and honors 
Inman received the ASME 2015 Rayleigh Lecture Award from the ASME unit Noise Control and Acoustics Division (NCAD) in the year 2015. He got the Structural Dynamics and Materials Award in January 2014 from the AIAA. He also received the honorary professorship from the Nanjing University of Aeronautics and Astronautics, Nanjing, Jiangsu, China, awarded October 2009. In September 2009, he received the Structural Health Monitoring Lifetime Achievement Award. He also got the Dean’s Award for Excellence in Research, Virginia Tech, in the same year. He received the Mechanical Engineering Distinguished Alumni Award from the Michigan State University in 2008. He also got the ASME/Boeing Structural Materials Best Paper Award in April 2008. He got the ASME J.P. Den Hartog Medal in 2007. Dr. Inman received the ASME Best Paper Award in structural Dynamics and control, awarded in March 2007. In the same year, he got DE Michele Award of the Society for Experimental Mechanics. He received the Benjamin Meaker Visiting Professorship in May 2004 from the University of Bristol, UK, for visiting during AY 2004-05 and lecturing on smart Structures. He got the SPIE 2003 Smart Structures and Materials Lifetime Achievement Award, in March 2003. Dr. Inman received the H. C. Pusey Best Paper Award in November 2002. He also received the President’s Award for Research Excellence (Virginia Tech), awarded May 2001. He got the ASME AIAA SDM Best Paper Award in April 2001. He received the ASME/Boeing Structural Materials Best Paper Award in April 2000. In the same year, he got the ASME 2000 Adaptive structures and Material Systems Prize. He also awarded as the ASME Distinguished Lecturer, 1995–2004.

Inman received the Fellowships from the Society for Experimental Mechanics (2016), National Institute of Aerospace (2004), American Institute of Aeronautics and Astronautics (2002), International Institute of Acoustics and Vibrations (1999), American Academy of Mechanics (1997), American Society of Mechanical Engineers (1990) and also he received the Young Presidential Award by Ronald Reagan and administered by the National Science Foundation.

Books 
Dr. Inman has published many books and chapters. Here are some of his notable contributions.
 Inman, D. J., 2017.  Vibration with Control, 2nd Edition, John Wiley and Sons, Ltd, New York, NY.
 Inman, D. J., Engineering Vibration, Pearson, Upper Saddle River, NJ, 1994, 1996 (7th printing in 1999); 2nd Edition, 2000 (9th printing in 2006); Korean edition, January 2003; 3rd Edition, 2007, 4th Edition, 2013.
 Erturk, A.. and Inman, D. J., 2011.  Piezoelectric Energy Harvesting, John Wiley & Sons, Ltd., Chichester, West Sussex, UK, 416 pp.
 Soutas-Little, R. W., Inman, D. J., and Balint, D., 2009. Engineering Mechanics:  Dynamics, Computational Edition, Thompson International, Florence, KY.
 Soutas-Little, R. W., Inman, D. J., and Balint, D., 2007.  A Matlab Manual for Engineering Mechanics, Statics, Computational Edition, Thompson International, Florence, KY.
 Soutas-Little, R. W., Inman, D. J., and Balint, D., 2007.   A Mathcad Manual for Engineering Mechanics, Statics, Computational Edition, Thompson International, Florence, KY.
 Soutas-Little, R. W., Inman, D. J., and Balint, D., 2007.  A Mathematica Manual for Engineering Mechanics, Statics, Computational Edition, Thompson International, Florence, KY.
 Soutas-Little, R. W., Inman, D. J., and Balint, D., 2007.  A Maple Manual for Engineering Mechanics, Statics, Computational Edition, Thompson International, Florence, KY.
 Soutas-Little, R. W., Inman, D. J., and Balint, D., 2007.  Engineering Mechanics: Statics, Computational Edition, Thompson International, Florence, KY.
 Inman, D. J., 2006.  Vibration with Control, John Wiley and Sons, Ltd, New York, NY.
 Inman, D. J. and Cudney, H. H., 2000, Structural and Machine Design Using Piezoceramic Materials: a Guide for Structural Design Engineers, Final Report  NASA Langley Grant NAG-1-1998
 outas-Little, R. W. and Inman, D. J., 1999.  Engineering Mechanics:  Dynamics, Prentice Hall, Upper Saddle River, NJ.
 Soutas-Little, R. W. and Inman, D. J., 1998.  Engineering Mechanics:  Statics, Prentice-Hall, Upper Saddle River, NJ.
 Inman, D. J., 1989.  Vibrations: Control, Measurement and Stability, Prentice Hall, Upper Saddle River, NJ.

References 

Year of birth missing (living people)
Living people
Michigan State University alumni
State University of New York faculty
University of Michigan faculty
Fellows of the Society for Experimental Mechanics